Konrad Witz (1400/1410 probably in Rottweil, Germany – winter 1445/spring 1446 in Basel, in current day Switzerland) was a German painter, active mainly in Basel. His 1444 panel The Miraculous Draft of Fishes (a portion of a lost altarpiece) has been credited as the earliest extant faithful portrayal of a landscape in European art history, being based on observation of real topographical features.

Witz is most famous for painting three altarpieces, all of which survive only partially. The next is the Altarpiece of the Virgin (c. 1440), which has been associated with panels now in Basel, Nuremberg, and Strasbourg (Saint Madeleine and Saint Catherine, Musée de l'Œuvre Notre-Dame). Witz's final altarpiece is the St. Peter Altarpiece of 1444, painted for St. Peter's Cathedral, Geneva, and now in the Musée d'Art et d'Histoire, Geneva, which contains his most famous composition, the Miraculous Draft of Fishes.

The painting of St. Christopher (Kunstmuseum, Basel; illustrated) does not seem to be related to these major altarpieces. Other independent works by Witz and his followers can be found in Naples, Berlin, and New York (Frick Collection). The Ambraser Hofjagdspiel is attributed to him.

See also
 The Knights Abisai, Sibbechai and Benaja Bring King David Water, Konrad Witz, 1435, part of the Heilspiegel Altarpiece

Notes

1400s births
1440s deaths
15th-century German painters
German male painters
People from Rottweil
Artists from Basel-Stadt
15th-century Swiss painters